Jean-Yves Fourmeau is a French classical saxophonist and is the classical music professor at the CRR de Cergy-Pontoise.

Biography

At age 17, Fourmeau won first prize at the Paris Conservatoire in the 3rd cycle of chamber music, which was unprecedented at the time. He maintains an active solo career and has performed with many orchestras across the world. He is currently the saxophone soloist for the Berlin Philharmonic and Radio France. In 1979 he formed a saxophone quartet that bears his name and is the soprano saxophonist in it. Fourmeau has been a consultant for Yamaha since 1986. He has recorded a total of 14 CDs during his career.

Discography
Saxophone and Piano
Musique d'ici et d'ailleurs, Works of MARAIS, GRANADOS, DUBOIS, ITTURALDE, PIAZZOLA, BERNSTEIN, BENSON, GRIEG
Sérénade, Works of CRESTON, PASCAL, CONSTANT, BOUTRY, SANCAN, BEDARD
Les Tableaux de Provence,   Works of DESENCLOS, DUBOIS, CHARPENTIER, BERIO, BOUTRY, MAURICE, DAMASE
Rendez-vous, Works of DEBUSSY, DECRUCK, FRANCK

Saxophone and Orchestra
Musical Feeling, with National Police Band Orchestra.
Claude Debussy, with National Orchestra of Lyon
Saxophone et Orchestre à cordes de la Garde Républicaine, with the Republican Guard Orchestra

Saxophone Quartet
Fresque, works of J. NAULAIS
Live in Matsumoto, Works of BACH, VIVALDI, PIERNE, PIAZZOLLA
Quatuor de saxophones Jean-Yves Fourmeau, Works of FELD, MARGONI, TISNE, MIGOT
French Masterpieces, Works of BOZZA, DESENCLOS, PIERNE, DUBOIS, RIVIER, FRANCAIX
The Art, Works of BACH, BARBER, VIVALDI, PIAZZOLA, ROTA, WAIGNIEN, LUYPAERTS, HAMEL, BRUBECK
Le quatuor de saxophones Jean-Yves Fourmeau en récital, Works of HAENDEL, SINGELEE, MOZART, MENDELSSOHN, VIVALDI, ROSSINI, SCIORTINO, ALLESSANDRINI, PETIT, LOCHU, JOPLIN
Cinesax, Works of Lalo SCHIFRIN, Henri MANCINI, Nino ROTA, Georges DELERUE, Vladimir COSMA, Jean-Claude PETIT, Michel LEGRAND, Raymond ALESSANDRINI, Léonard BERNSTEIN
Le Bal, Works of Thierry Escaish; exhibition pictures of Modest Moussorgsky; three penny opera of  Kurt Weill.

External links
  Official website

References

Year of birth missing (living people)
Living people
French classical musicians
French saxophonists
Male saxophonists
Players of the Berlin Philharmonic
Classical saxophonists
21st-century saxophonists